Barry Keith Hammett,  (born 9 October 1947) is a Church of England priest and former Royal Navy chaplain. He was Chaplain of the Fleet, Director General of the Naval Chaplaincy Service and Archdeacon for the Royal Navy from 2002 to 2006.

He was born on 9 October 1947 and educated at Eltham College; Magdalen College, Oxford; and St Stephen's House, Oxford. He was ordained deacon in  1974, and priest in 1975; 
He served as a naval chaplain from 1977 to 2006. He was also an Honorary Chaplain to the Queen from 1999 to 2006.

Footnotes

1947 births
Living people
20th-century English Anglican priests
21st-century English Anglican priests
Chaplains of the Fleet
People educated at Eltham College
Companions of the Order of the Bath
Alumni of St Stephen's House, Oxford
Alumni of Magdalen College, Oxford
Honorary Chaplains to the Queen
Church of England archdeacons (military)